James Alan Les (born August 18, 1963) is an American basketball coach and former player who is the head coach of the UC Davis Aggies men's team. A former point guard, Les played seven seasons in the National Basketball Association (NBA) after his college career at Bradley University.

In 2011, he was hired as the head coach of the UC Davis Aggies men's basketball team.

College career
Les began his collegiate basketball career playing at Cleveland State University, but transferred after the 1981–82 season to Bradley.  While attending Bradley University he was a member of the Accounting Student Association and the Delta Upsilon fraternity. When he left college in 1986, he had compiled the second most assists in NCAA history in a combined playing career with Cleveland State and Bradley.

Professional career
A 5'11" point guard, Les was the 70th overall pick in the 1986 NBA Draft, selected in the third round by the Atlanta Hawks. However, the Hawks waived Les in July 1986. Two months later, Les signed with the Philadelphia 76ers but was waived in December without playing a game. Les re-signed with the 76ers on July 1, 1987 but was waived on November 3 before the regular season.

Les later signed with the Rochester Flyers of the Continental Basketball Association (CBA) and played 12 games from 1987 to 1988. In the summer of 1988, Les signed with the Chicago Express of the World Basketball League (WBL). Les was a 1988 All-WBL selection and led the league in three-point field goal percentage in 1988 with 46.7%. The Chicago Express were runners-up in the WBL championship.

Les signed with the NBA's Milwaukee Bucks on October 19, 1988 but was waived the next day. He then signed with the Utah Jazz and made his NBA debut on November 4, 1988. Les played all 82 games of the  season. Les averaged 9.5 minutes, 1.7 points, 1.1 rebounds, and 2.6 assists per game. After playing one game in the beginning of the  season, Les was waived by the Jazz on November 6, 1989. Les then joined the Santa Barbara Islanders of the CBA and averaged 14.6 points and 9.8 assists a game. Les returned to the NBA on February 6, 1990 with the Los Angeles Clippers and was waived on February 27 after playing 6 games.

In the summer of 1990, Les signed with the WBL's Saskatchewan Storm. On July 16, Les scored 38 points and had 17 assists to rally the Storm to a 140–136 win over the Calgary 88s after trailing by 16 at halftime. Les made 6 of 7 three-point attempts.

Les signed with the NBA's Charlotte Hornets on August 29, 1990 but was waived before the regular season on October 23, 1990. On December 31, Les signed with the Sacramento Kings. Following two ten-day contracts, Les signed with the Kings for the rest of the season on January 20, 1991. With the Kings that season, Les reached career highs in scoring average (7.2 PPG), assists (5.4 APG), steals (1.04 SPG) and field goal percentage (.444), while also leading the league in three-point field goal percentage (.461).  The following year, he was runner-up to Craig Hodges in the AT&T Long Distance Shootout contest. Les played over 200 games for the Kings over 4 seasons before the team waived him on January 9, 1994.

Les signed with the Omaha Racers (formerly the Rochester Flyers) of the CBA after leaving the Kings.   With the Racers, Les was both a player and assistant coach. With 20.2 points per game, Les was the Racers' leading scorer in the playoffs, and the Racers advanced to the 1994 CBA Finals.

On August 9, 1994, Les signed with the NBA's Atlanta Hawks. In 24 games, Les averaged 2.1 points, 1.1 rebounds, and 1.8 assists. In October 1995, Les signed with CB Salamanca of the Spanish Liga ACB and was waived in December. Les averaged 13.4 points, 3.4 rebounds, and 4.7 assists in 7 games with Salamanca.

Coaching career

Following his NBA career, Les was an assistant coach for the WNBA's Sacramento Monarchs from 1999 to 2001. Les was on the staff of Monarchs head coach Sonny Allen in 1999 and 2000 and Maura McHugh in 2001. In all three seasons with Les as an assistant coach, the Monarchs made the WNBA Playoffs and advanced to the 2001 WNBA Conference Finals.

In 2002, he returned to his alma mater Bradley University as head coach, where he led Bradley to an improved record in each of his first two seasons.  The Bradley Braves advanced to the Sweet Sixteen in the NCAA tournament in 2006.  The following year the Braves exceeded expectations to make it to the NIT. In 2008, the Braves participated in their third consecutive postseason tournament when they were invited to the first annual College Basketball Invitational tournament.  The Braves advanced to the CBI finals, defeating Cincinnati, Ohio University and Virginia, while losing two games to one to Tulsa in the CBI championship round.

In 2009, the Braves participated in their fourth consecutive postseason tournament when they were invited to the first annual CollegeInsider.com Postseason Tournament.  The Braves beat Austin Peay 81–74 in the first round of the tournament, and then went on to beat Oakland University 76–75 on a miracle 70-foot shot by Chris Roberts at the buzzer to earn Les his fourth consecutive 20-win season.  The Braves advanced to the CIT finals with a win over Pacific, while losing to Old Dominion 66–62 in the CIT championship game. The Bradley Braves finished the 2009–10 season in fifth place at 9–9 in the Missouri Valley Conference.  Bradley finished the 2010–11 season tied for ninth place at 4–14 in the Missouri Valley Conference.

Professional basketball players who played at Bradley under Les include Zach Andrews, Danny Granger, and Patrick O'Bryant.

Les was relieved of his duties on March 6, 2011 after the Braves finished a disappointing 12–20 campaign.

Personal
Les' older brother Tom played for the Bradley Braves from 1972 to 1975 and is the school's all-time assists leader. Their father, Richard Les, died of Parkinson's disease in 2011. Les has three children, including Tyler, who played basketball at UC Davis under him.

Head coaching record

See also
 List of NBA season leaders in three-point field goal percentage
 List of NCAA Division I men's basketball career assists leaders

References

External links
UC Davis biography of Les
Career Stats from Basketball-reference.com
Liga ACB biography (Spanish)

1963 births
Living people
American expatriate basketball people in Canada
American expatriate basketball people in Spain
American men's basketball coaches
American men's basketball players
American women's basketball coaches
Atlanta Hawks draft picks
Atlanta Hawks players
Basketball coaches from Illinois
Basketball players from Illinois
Bradley Braves men's basketball coaches
Bradley Braves men's basketball players
Cleveland State Vikings men's basketball players
College men's basketball head coaches in the United States
Continental Basketball Association coaches
Liga ACB players
Los Angeles Clippers players
Omaha Racers players
People from Niles, Illinois
Point guards
Sacramento Kings players
Sacramento Monarchs coaches
Santa Barbara Islanders players
Sportspeople from Cook County, Illinois
UC Davis Aggies men's basketball coaches
Utah Jazz players